The Azerbaijan men's national field hockey team represents Azerbaijan in international men's field hockey and is controlled by the Azerbaijan Field Hockey Federation, the governing body for field hockey in Azerbaijan.

The national team hasn't participated in any international competitions since November 2016 because the national association was suspended on 12 November 2016.

Competitive record

European championships

*Draws include matches decided on a penalty shoot-out.

Hockey World League

*Draws include matches decided on a penalty shoot-out.

See also
Azerbaijan women's national field hockey team

References

External links
 https://web.archive.org/web/20160802163756/http://azhf.az/
 https://www.mycomlink.co.za/organisation.php?i=1913
 https://web.archive.org/web/20181227230342/http://www.mys.gov.az/en/ministry/partners/41/azerbaijan-field-hockey-federation

Field hockey
European men's national field hockey teams
National team